Jessika Rebecca Macayan Cowart (born October 30, 1999) is a footballer who plays as a midfielder or a defender for Damallsvenskan club IFK Kalmar. Born in the United States, she represents the Philippines women's national team.

College career
Cowart played collegiate soccer at University of Washington. She received the 2019 Husky Invitational Tournament Defensive MVP Award playing as a defensive midfielder against the University of North Carolina, University of Portland, and University of New Mexico. She appeared in 66 matches with 51 starts, including the 2019 NCAA Division I Women's Soccer Tournament.

Club career

Youth
Cowart had her youth career at Palo Alto Soccer Club and PSV Union. She also played for the varsity soccer team of Woodside High School in California.

Çaykur Rizespor
In 2022, Cowart joined Turkish Women's Football Super League club Çaykur Rizespor. She made her debut for the club in a 3–1 win against Adana İdman Yurdu. She finished the season with 10 starts in 10 matches for the club, scoring two goals and two assists.

California Storm
After her short stint in the Turkish top flight, Cowart joined Women's Premier Soccer League club California Storm, who later won the 2022 WPSL Championship.

Spartak Subotica
Cowart joined ŽFK Spartak Subotica of the Serbian Women's Super League in August 2022. She made her debut for the club against Norwegian side SK Brann Kvinner during the first round of the 2022 UEFA Women's Champions League

IFK Kalmar 
In 2023, it was announced that Cowart has joined Damallsvenskan club IFK Kalmar.

International career
Cowart is eligible to represent either United States or Philippines at the international level.

Philippines
In June 2022, Cowart was included in the Philippines squad for the national team's training camp in Europe. The training camp was part of the national team's preparation for the 2022 AFF Women's Championship, held in the Philippines.

Cowart made her debut for the Philippines in a 1–0 friendly loss against Republic of Ireland, coming in as a substitute replacing Dominique Randle in the 67th minute.

She would make five appearances at the 2022 AFF Championship which the Philippines won.

International goals

Honours

International

Philippines 
 AFF Women's Championship: 2022

References

1999 births
Living people
Citizens of the Philippines through descent
Filipino women's footballers
Women's association football defenders
Women's association football midfielders
Philippines women's international footballers
American women's soccer players
Soccer players from California
Washington Huskies women's soccer players
American sportspeople of Filipino descent
African-American women's soccer players
Filipino people of African-American descent
Sportspeople of American descent